Ja Bolo Tai Bolo is the second studio album by Bangladeshi-Indian singer-songwriter Sahana Bajpaie. It is a collection of Rabindra Sangeet which was released on September 5, 2015, by Major Music from India and Bangladesh.

Track listing

Personnel 
 Shayan Chowdhury Arnob – composition

References

External links 
 Albums of Sahana Bajpaie
 Ja Bolo Tai Bolo at iTunes
 Ja Bolo Tai Bolo at Last.fm

2007 albums
Sahana Bajpaie albums
Bengali-language albums
Bengal Music Company albums